Chlorophyll b is a form of chlorophyll. Chlorophyll b helps in photosynthesis by absorbing light energy. It is more soluble than chlorophyll a in polar solvents because of its carbonyl group. Its color is green, and it primarily absorbs blue light.

In land plants, the light-harvesting antennae around photosystem II contain the majority of chlorophyll b. Hence, in shade-adapted chloroplasts, which have an increased ratio of photosystem II to photosystem I, there is a higher ratio of chlorophyll b to chlorophyll a. This is adaptive, as increasing chlorophyll b increases the range of wavelengths absorbed by the shade chloroplasts.

Biosynthesis

The Chlorophyll b biosynthetic pathway utilizes a variety of enzymes. In most plants, chlorophyll is derived from glutamate and is synthesised along a branched pathway that is shared with heme and siroheme.
The initial steps incorporate glutamic acid into 5-aminolevulinic acid (ALA); two molecules of ALA are then reduced to porphobilinogen (PBG), and four molecules of PBG are coupled, forming protoporphyrin IX.

Chlorophyll synthase is the enzyme that completes the biosynthesis of chlorophyll b by catalysing the reaction 
chlorophyllide b + phytyl diphosphate  chlorophyll b + diphosphate
This forms an ester of the carboxylic acid group in chlorophyllide b with the 20-carbon diterpene alcohol phytol.

References

Tetrapyrroles
Photosynthetic pigments